The St. Albans Raid was the northernmost land action of the American Civil War. It was a raid from the Province of Canada by 21 Confederate soldiers. They had recently failed in engagements with the Union Army and evaded subsequent capture in the United States. The mission was to rob banks to raise money, and to trick the Union Army into diverting troops to defend their northern border against further raids. It took place in St. Albans, Vermont, on October 19, 1864. They got the money, killed a local, and escaped back to Canada.

Background
In this wartime incident, Kentuckian Bennett H. Young led the Confederate army forces. Young had been captured after the Battle of Salineville in Ohio ended Morgan's Raid the year before. He managed to escape to Canada, which was not then a unified nation. After meeting with Confederate agents there, he returned to the Confederacy, where he proposed raids on the Union from the Canada–US border to build the Confederate treasury and force the Union Army to divert troops from the South. Young was commissioned as a lieutenant and returned to Canada, where he recruited other escaped Confederates for a raid on St. Albans, Vermont, a quiet city just  from the Canada–U.S. border.

Lead-up and planning 
The first two raiders arrived in Philipsburg, Canada East, on the morning of October 11, where they stayed at the Lafayette Hotel. More people reached the hotel throughout the day; the city served as an ideal starting-point because it was within  of the Canada–United States border. Young was planning for a series of raids beginning with St. Albans, which was chosen first because it was close to the border and well-connected through roads, railways, and waterways. It also had three banks in close proximity and was a "prosperous market town". Young was the first of the raiders to arrive at St. Albans, on October 12. Upon arrival he began to inspect the city, particularly the three banks.

The twenty-two young raiders planned to rob three banksthe First National, St. Albans, and Franklin County Banksand then set fire to the town using Greek fire. They reached the town in pairs after Young, posing as part of a hunting and fishing club. Young was forced to postpone the raid, initially set for October 18, because the town would have been too busy, instead settling on October 19, a Wednesday, as it would be "the dullest [day] of the week."

Raid
It began on Wednesday afternoon as Young set a gun off. Most townspeople "believed it was a joke or a prank", but one of the raiders soon announced "we are Confederate soldiers and you are my prisoners" they robbed St. Albans Bank, the first of the three. They took cash from several people who came in to pay deposits as well as cash in the bank, but left uncut bank notes and coins behind. The prisoners were forced to swear allegiance to the Confederate States of America before being locked in the bank. After twelve minutes, the robbers had moved on.

Nine raiders were delegated to take the town as the robberies were ongoing, moving inhabitants onto the village green. Soon, resistance emerged in the form of Captain George Conger, a member of the 1st Vermont Infantry Regiment on leave, who began alerting the rest of the town and raised a group to fight back. In the face of resistance, Young and his group retreated, attempting to fire the town as they went. They reached Canada around 9:00 P.M., after crossing the Missisquoi River. While they planned to return to Montreal, the Canadian police captured or otherwise held thirteen of the men in captivity. Young soon resolved to give himself up.

He took board in a house near Philipsburg. The home's owner alerted Conger, who had pursued the raiders into Canada. Conger's group took Young prisoner. He attempted to escape, but was recaptured quickly by the mob, who began attacking him. The fight was broken up by a British officer who saw that Conger's entourage returned to Vermont and that Young and seven other captured raiders were soon brought to Saint-Jean-sur-Richelieu, where "they were treated as heroes".

The raiders escaped to Canada, despite a delayed pursuit. In response to US demands, the Canadian authorities arrested the raiders, recovering . However, a Canadian court ruled that because they were soldiers under military orders, officially neutral Canada could not extradite them. Canada freed the raiders but returned to St. Albans the money found.

Aftermath 
The release of the raiders angered American opinion. As U.S. Secretary of State William H. Seward informed his counterparts in London, "it is impossible to consider those proceedings as either legal, just or friendly towards the United States." In Europe, news of the raid and subsequent speculation of war between Britain and the U.S. increase the price of Confederate gold bonds.

As an unintended consequence, the raid served to turn many Canadians against the Confederacy since they felt that Canada was being drawn into the conflict without its consent. The Confederate agents in Canada realized that and so no further raids were made.

None of the three banks still stand as of 2020. Other sites surviving are Taylor Park and the American House, where some of the raiders stayed.

Film
The 1954 film The Raid was loosely based on this incident.

See also

Canada in the American Civil War
Military history of Vermont
Ann Eliza Smith
La Paz incident and Battle of Stanwix Station, considered the westernmost actions of the war

References

Bibliography

Further reading

External links

The St. Albans raid, virtualvermont.com
History of the raid and surrounding events, stalbansraid.com
St. Albans Raid: Spies, Raiders and Partisans, wtv-zone.com
Newspaper article providing an eyewitness account of the St. Albans Raid at newsinhistory.com
Raise The Flag & Sound The Cannon, a historical novel based on the St. Albans Raid by Donald Davison
Waiting on a Dream, a musical comedy about the St. Albans Raid, based on Raise the Flag & Sound The Cannon

	

1864 in Canada
1864 in Vermont
Raids of the American Civil War
Confederate victories of the American Civil War
Franklin County, Vermont
St. Albans, Vermont
Military operations of the American Civil War in Vermont
October 1864 events
Bank robberies